Sejong of Joseon (15 May 1397 – 8 April 1450), personal name Yi Do (Korean: 이도; Hanja: 李祹), widely known as Sejong the Great (Korean: 세종대왕; Hanja: 世宗大王), was the fourth ruler of the Joseon dynasty of Korea. Initially titled Grand Prince Chungnyeong (Korean: 충녕대군; Hanja: 忠寧大君), he was born as the third son of King Taejong and Queen Wongyeong. In 1418, he was designated as heir in place of his eldest brother, Crown Prince Yi Je. Today, King Sejong is regarded as one of the greatest leaders in Korean history.

Despite ascending to the throne after his father's voluntary abdication in 1418, Sejong was a mere figurehead; Taejong continued to hold the real power and govern the country up until his death in 1422. Sejong was the sole monarch for the next 28 years, although after 1439 he became increasingly ill, and starting from 1442, his eldest son, Crown Prince Yi Hyang (the future King Munjong), acted as regent.

Sejong reinforced Korean Confucian and Neo-Confucian policies, and enacted major legal amendments (공법, 貢法). He personally created and promulgated the Korean alphabet (today known as hangul), encouraged advancements in science and technology, and introduced measures to stimulate economic growth. He dispatched military campaigns to the north and instituted the Samin Jeongchaek ("Peasants Relocation Policy"; 사민정책, 徙民政策) to attract new settlers to the region. To the south, he helped subjugate Japanese pirates, during the Ōei Invasion.

Name 
Although the appellation "the Great" (대왕, 大王) was posthumously given to almost every monarch from the Goryeo and Joseon dynasties, this style is usually associated with Gwanggaeto and Sejong.

Early life
He was born on 10 April 1397, which was later adjusted to 15 May, after Korea's adoption of the Gregorian calendar in 1896. This date is his officially recognized birthday, and is celebrated along with National Teachers Day in South Korea.

Sejong was the son of King Taejong by his wife, Queen Wongyeong. When he was twelve, he became Grand Prince Chungnyeong (충녕대군). During childhood, he was favored by his father over his two older brothers.

As the third son of the king, his ascension to the throne was unique. Taejong's eldest son, Yi Je (이제), was named heir apparent in 1404. However, his free spirited nature as well as his preference for hunting and leisure activities resulted in his removal from the position in June 1418. Though it is said that he abdicated in favor of Sejong, there are no definitive records. Taejong's second son, Grand Prince Hyoryeong (효령대군), became a Buddhist monk upon the elevation of his younger brother.

Following Yi Je's demotion, Taejong moved quickly to secure his third son's place as heir apparent, and the government was purged of officials who disagreed with the change. In September 1418, Taejong abdicated. However, even in retirement he continued to influence government policy. Sejong's surprising political skill and creativity did not become apparent until after his father's death in 1422.

Governance

Religion
King Sejong reorganized the government by appointing people from different social classes as civil servants. Furthermore, he performed government ceremonies according to Confucianism, and encouraged people to behave according to the teachings of Confucius.

He suppressed Buddhism by banning outside monks from entering Hanseong (modern Seoul) and reduced the seven schools of Buddhism down to two, Seon and Gyo, drastically decreasing the power and wealth of the religious leaders. One of the key factors in this suppression was Sejong's reform of the land system. This policy resulted in temple lands being seized and redistributed for development, with the monks losing large amounts of economic influence. During the Goryeo dynasty, monks wielded a strong influence in politics and the economy. With the dominant powers of Joseon now being devout Confucianists, Buddhism was considered a false philosophy and the monks were viewed as corrupted by power and money. The Seokbosangjeol, a 24-volume Korean-language translation of Chinese Buddhist texts (a biography of Buddha and some of his sermons), was commissioned and published in Sejong's reign by his son Suyang, as an act of mourning for Queen Soheon.

In 1427, Sejong also gave a decree against the Huihui (Korean Muslim) community that had held special status and stipends since Yuan dynasty's rule over Goryeo. The Huihui were forced to abandon their headgear, to close down their "ceremonial hall" (a mosque in the city of Gaegyeong, in present-day Kaesong) and worship like everyone else. No further mention of Muslims exist during the Joseon era.

Economy
In the early years of the Joseon dynasty, the economy was based on a barter system with cloth, grain, and cotton being the most common forms of currency. In 1423, under King Sejong’s administration, the government attempted to develop a national currency modeled off of the Tang dynasty's Kaiyuan Tongbao. The Joseon Tongbo was a bronze coin, backed by a silver standard, with 150 coins being equal to 600 grams of silver. Production of the Joseon Tongbo ceased in 1425 because they were too expensive to make, with the exchange rate falling to less than the intrinsic value of the coin.

Foreign policy

Sejong collaborated closely with China's Ming dynasty. In relations with Jurchen people, he installed ten military posts (사군육진, 四郡六鎭), in the northern part of the peninsula.

He opened three ports to trade with Japan. However, he also launched expeditions to crush Japanese pirates (known as Waegu) in the East China Sea.

Military
King Sejong was an effective military planner. He created various military regulations to strengthen the safety of his kingdom, and supported the advancement of military technology, including cannon development. Different kinds of mortars and fire arrows were tested as well as the use of gunpowder.

In June 1419, under the advice and guidance of his father, Sejong embarked upon the Ōei Invasion. The ultimate goal of this military expedition was to remove the nuisance of Japanese pirates who had been operating close to Tsushima Island. During the invasion, 245 Japanese were killed, and another 110 were captured in combat, while 180 Korean soldiers died. More than 150 kidnap victims (146 Chinese and 8 Koreans) were also liberated. A truce was made in July 1419 and the Joseon army returned to the Korean peninsula, but no official documents were signed until 1443. In this agreement, known as the Treaty of Gyehae, the daimyo of Tsushima promised to pay tribute to the king of Joseon, and in return, the Joseon court rewarded the Sō clan with preferential rights regarding trade between the two countries.

In 1433, Sejong sent Gim Jong-seo (김종서, 金宗瑞), a prominent general, to the north to destroy the Jurchens (later known as the Manchus). Gim's military campaign captured several fortresses, pushed north, and expanded Korean territory, to the Songhua River. Four counties and six commanderies were established to safeguard the people from the Jurchens.

Science, technology, and agriculture

In 1420, King Sejong's love for science led him to create an institute within Gyeongbok Palace known as the Hall of Worthies (Jiphyeonjeon; literally "Jade Hall"; 집현전, 集賢殿). The institute was responsible for conducting scientific research with the purpose of advancing the country's technology. The Hall of Worthies was meant to be a collection of Joseon's best and brightest thinkers, with the government offering grants and scholarships to encourage young scholars to attend.

Sejong promoted the sciences. He wanted to help farmers so he decided to create a farmer's handbook. The book—Nongsa Jikseol (농사직설, 農事直說)—contained information about the different farming techniques that were gathered by scientists from different regions of Korea. These techniques were needed in order to maintain the newly adopted methods of intensive and continuous cultivation.

One of his close associates was the great inventor Jang Yeong-sil (장영실, 蔣英實). As a young person, Jang was a naturally creative and smart thinker. Sejong noticed his skill and immediately called him to his court in Hanseong. Upon giving Jang a government position and funding for his inventions, officials protested, believing a person from the lower classes should not rise to power among nobles. Sejong instead believed he merited support because of his ability. Jang Yeong-sil created new significant designs for water clocks, armillary spheres, and sundials.

In 1442, Jang Yeong-sil made one of the world's first standardized rain gauges named Cheugugi. This model has not survived, with the oldest existing Korean rain gauge being made in 1770, during the reign of King Yeongjo. According to the Daily Records of the Royal Secretariat (승정원일기, 承政院日記), Yeongjo wanted to revive the glorious times of King Sejong the Great, and so he read chronicles from that era. When he came across the mention of a rain gauge, Yeongjo ordered a reproduction. Since there is a mark of the Qing dynasty ruler Qianlong (r. 1735–96), dated 1770, this Korean-designed rain gauge is sometimes misunderstood as having been imported from China.

In 1434, Jang Yeong-sil, tasked by King Sejong, invented the Gabinja (갑인자, 甲寅字), a new type of printing press. This printing press was said to be twice as fast as the previous model and was composed of copper-zinc and lead-tin alloys.

Sejong also wanted to reform the Korean calendar system, which was at the time based upon the longitude of the Chinese capital. He had his astronomers create a calendar with the Joseon capital of Hanseong as the primary meridian. This new system allowed Joseon astronomers to accurately predict the timing of solar and lunar eclipses.

In the realm of traditional Korean medicine, two important treatises were written during his reign. These were the Hyangyak Jipseongbang and the Euibang Yuchwi, which historian Kim Yong-sik says represents "the Koreans' efforts to develop their own system of medical knowledge, distinct from that of China".

Public welfare
In 1426, Sejong enacted a law that granted government nobi (slave) women 100 days of maternity leave after childbirth, which, in 1430, was lengthened by one month before childbirth. In 1434, he also granted the husbands 30 days of paternity leave.

In order to provide equality and fairness in taxation for the common people, Sejong issued a royal decree to administer a nationwide public opinion poll regarding a new tax system called Gongbeop in 1430. Over the course of five months, the poll surveyed 172,806 people, of which approximately 57% responded with approval for the proposed reform.

Joseon's economy depended on the agricultural output of the farmers, so Sejong allowed them to pay more or less tax according to the fluctuations of economic prosperity and hard times. Because of this, farmers could worry less about tax quotas and instead work at maintaining and selling their crops.

It is said that once, when the palace had a significant surplus of food, the king distributed it to poor peasants who needed it.

Literature
In 1429, Nongsa Jikseol ("Explanations of Agriculture"; 농사직설, 農事直說) was compiled. It was the first book about Korean farming, dealing with agricultural subjects such as planting, harvesting, and soil treatment.

Sejong was also a writer. He composed the famous Yongbieocheonga ("Songs of Flying Dragons"; 1445), Seokbo Sangjeol ("Episodes from the Life of Buddha"; July 1447), Worin Cheongang Jigok ("Songs of the Moon Shining on a Thousand Rivers"; July 1447), and Dongguk Jeongun ("Dictionary of Proper Sino-Korean Pronunciation"; September 1447).

Arts
One of Sejong’s closest friends and mentors was the 15th century musician Park Yeon. Together they composed over two hundred musical arrangements. Sejong’s independent musical compositions include the Chongdaeop ("Great Achievements"), Potaepyeong ("Preservation of Peace"), Pongnaeui ("Phoenix"), and Yominrak ("A Joy to Share with the People"). Yominrak continues to be a standard piece played by modern traditional Korean orchestras, while Chongdaeop and Potaepyeong are played during the Jongmyo Jerye (memorials honoring the kings of the Joseon dynasty).

In 1418, during Sejong's reign, scholars developed the Pyeongyeong (편경, 編磬), a lithophone modeled off of the Chinese Bianqing. The Pyeongyeong is a percussion instrument consisting of two rows of 8 pumice slabs hung on a decorative wooden frame with a 16-tone range and struck with an ox horn mallet. It was manufactured using pumice mined from the Gyeonggi Province and was primarily used for ceremonies.

Hangul

King Sejong profoundly affected Korea's history with the creation and introduction of hangul, the native phonetic writing system for the Korean language. Although it is widely assumed that he ordered the Hall of Worthies to invent the script, contemporary records such as the Veritable Records of King Sejong and Jeong In-ji's preface to the Hunminjeongeum Haerye emphasize that Sejong invented it himself.

Before the creation of the new letters, people in the country primarily wrote using Classical Chinese alongside phonetic writing systems based on Chinese script that predated hangul by hundreds of years, including idu, hyangchal, gugyeol, and gakpil. However, due to the fundamental differences between the Korean and Chinese languages, and the large number of characters that needed to be studied, the lower classes, who often lacked the privilege of education, had much difficulty in learning how to write. To assuage this problem, King Sejong created this unique alphabet (which numbered 28 letters at its introduction, of which four letters have become obsolete) to promote literacy among the common people. Each consonant letter is based on a simplified diagram of the patterns made by the human speech organs (the mouth, tongue and teeth) when producing the sound related to the character, while vowels were formed by combinations of dots and lines representing heaven (a circular dot), earth (a horizontal line) and humanity (a vertical line). Morphemes are built by writing the characters in syllabic blocks. The blocks of letters are then strung together linearly.

Hangul was completed in 1443 and published in 1446 along with a 33-page manual titled Hunminjeongeum, explaining what the letters are as well as the philosophical theories and motives behind them. The manual purported that anyone could learn the alphabet in a matter of days. People previously unfamiliar with it can typically pronounce Korean words accurately after only a few hours of study.

King Sejong faced backlash from the noble class as many disapproved of the idea of a common writing system, with some openly opposing its creation. Many within the nobility believed that giving the peasants the ability to read and write would allow them to find and abuse loopholes within the law. Others felt that hangul would threaten their families’ positions in court by creating a larger pool of civil servants. The Joseon elite continued to use the Chinese hanja long after Sejong’s death. Hangul was often treated with contempt by those in power and received criticism in the form of nicknames, including eonmun ("vulgar script"), amkeul ("women’s script"), and ahaekkeul ("children’s script"). Despite this, the system gained popularity among women and fiction writers.

In 1504, the study and publication of hangul was banned by Yeonsangun. Its spread and preservation can be largely attributed to three main factors: books published for women, its use by Buddhist monks, and the introduction of Christianity in Korea in 1602. Hangul was brought into the mainstream culture in the 16th century, due to a renaissance in literature and poetry. It continued to gain popularity well into the 17th century, and gained wider use after a period of nationalism in the 19th century. In 1849, it was adopted as Korea’s national writing system, and saw its first use in official government documents. After the Treaty of 1910, hangul was outlawed again until the liberation of Korea in 1945.

Death

Sejong was blinded by diabetes complications that eventually took his life in 1450. He was buried at Yeongneung, in the same mound as his wife, Queen Soheon, who died four years earlier. The tomb is located in Yeoju, Gyeonggi Province, South Korea.

His successor was his first son, Yi Hyang (posthumously honored as King Munjong). Sejong judged that the sickly Munjong was unlikely to live long, and on his deathbed asked the scholars from the Hall of Worthies to look after his young grandson, Danjong. As predicted, Munjong died two years after his ascension, and the political stability enjoyed in the past decades disintegrated when Danjong became the sixth king of Joseon at the age of twelve. Eventually, Sejong's second son, Grand Prince Suyang (later known as King Sejo), usurped the throne in 1455. When six court officials were implicated in a plot to restore his nephew, Sejo abolished the Hall of Worthies and executed Danjong along with several ministers who served during Sejong's reign.

Family
Father: King Taejong of Joseon (조선 태종) (13 June 1367 – 30 May 1422)
Grandfather: King Taejo of Joseon (조선 태조) (27 October 1335 – 18 June 1408)
Grandmother: Queen Sinui of the Cheongju Han clan (신의왕후 한씨) (September 1337 – 21 October 1391)
Mother: Queen Wongyeong of the Yeoheung Min clan (원경왕후 민씨) (11 July 1365 – 10 July 1420)
Grandfather: Min Je (민제) (1339 – 1408)
Grandmother: Lady Song of the Yeosan Song clan (여산 송씨) (1342 – 1424)
Consorts and their respective issue(s):
 Queen Soheon of the Cheongsong Shim clan (소헌왕후 심씨) (12 October 1395 – 19 April 1446)
 Princess Jeongso (정소공주) (1412 – 1424), first daughter
 Crown Prince Yi Hyang (왕세자 이향) (15 November 1414 – 1 June 1452), first son
 Princess Jeongui (정의공주) (1415 – 11 February 1477), second daughter
 Yi Yu, Grand Prince Suyang (수양대군 이유) (2 November 1417 – 23 September 1468), second son
 Yi Yong, Grand Prince Anpyeong (안평대군 이용) (18 October 1418 – 18 November 1453), third son
 Yi Gu, Grand Prince Imyeong (임영대군 이구) (6 January 1420 – 21 January 1469), fourth son
 Yi Yeo, Grand Prince Gwangpyeong (광평대군 이여) (2 May 1425 – 7 December 1444), fifth son
 Yi Yu, Grand Prince Geumseong (금성대군 이유) (5 May 1426 – 7 November 1457), seventh son
 Yi Im, Grand Prince Pyeongwon (평원대군 이임) (18 November 1427 – 16 January 1445), ninth son
 Yi Yeom, Grand Prince Yeongeung (영응대군 이염) (23 May 1434 – 2 February 1467), fifteenth son
 Royal Noble Consort Yeong of the Jinju Gang clan (영빈 강씨)
 Yi Yeong, Prince Hwaui (화의군 이영) (1425 – 1460), sixth son
 Royal Noble Consort Shin of the Cheongju Gim clan (신빈 김씨) (1406 – 4 September 1464)
 Third daughter (? – 1426)
 Yi Jeung, Prince Gyeyang (계양군 이증) (1427 – 16 August 1464), eighth son
 Yi Gong, Prince Uichang (의창군 이공) (1428 – 1460), tenth son
 Fifth daughter (? – 1429)
 Yi Chim, Prince Milseong (밀성군 이침) (1430 – 1479), twelfth son
 Yi Yeon, Prince Ikhyeon (익현군 이연) (1431 – 1463), fourteenth son
 Yi Dang, Prince Yeonghae (영해군 이당) (1435 – 1477), seventeenth son
 Yi Geo, Prince Damyang (담양군 이거) (1439 – August 1450), eighteenth son
 Royal Noble Consort Hye of the Cheongju Yang clan (혜빈 양씨) (? – 9 November 1455)
 Yi Eo, Prince Hannam (한남군 이어) (5 October 1429 – 29 June 1459), eleventh son
 Yi Hyeon, Prince Suchun (수춘군 이현) (1431 – 1455), thirteenth son
 Yi Jeon, Prince Yeongpung (영풍군 이전) (17 September 1434 – 22 July 1456), sixteenth son
 Royal Consort Gwi-in of the Miryang Park clan (귀인 박씨)
 Royal Consort Gwi-in of the Jeonju Choe clan (귀인 최씨)
 Royal Consort Sug-ui of the Jo clan (숙의 조씨)
 Royal Consort Sug-yong of the Hong clan (숙용 홍씨) (? – 4 February 1452)
 Royal Consort Sug-won of the Yi clan (숙원 이씨)
 Princess Jeongan (정안옹주) (1438 – 1461), seventh daughter
 Court Lady Song (상침 송씨) (1396 – 1463)
 Princess Jeonghyeon (정현옹주) (1425 – 1480), fourth daughter
 Court Lady Cha (사기 차씨) (? – 10 July 1444)
 Sixth daughter (1430 – 1431)

Ancestry

Legacy

Statue and museum exhibit

In 2009, a  bronze statue of King Sejong was placed on a concrete pedestal on the boulevard of Gwanghwamun Square and directly in front of the Sejong Center for the Performing Arts in Seoul. The sculptor was Kim Young-won. The pedestal contains one of the several entrances to the 3,200 m2 underground museum exhibit entitled "The Story of King Sejong". It was unveiled on Hangul Day in celebration of the 563rd anniversary of the invention of the Korean alphabet.

Namesake from Sejong 
Sejong Street (Sejongno; 세종로, 世宗路) and the Sejong Centre for the Performing Arts, both located in central Seoul, are named after King Sejong.

In early 2007, the government of the Republic of Korea decided to create a special administrative district from a part of the South Chungcheong Province, near what is presently Daejeon. The district was named "Sejong Special Autonomous City".

Portrait in Korean currency 

A portrait of Sejong is featured on the 10,000 won banknote of the South Korean won, along with various scientific tools invented under his reign.

In popular culture

Dramas and films
His life was depicted in the KBS historical drama The Great King, Sejong in 2008.
 Portrayed by Han In-soo in the 1983 MBC TV series 500 Years of Joseon dynasty: Tree with Deep Roots.
 Portrayed by Song Jae-ho in the 1998–2000 KBS TV series King and Queen. 
 Portrayed by Lee Hyun-woo and Kim Sang-kyung in the 2008 KBS2 TV series The Great King, Sejong.
 Portrayed by Ahn Sung-ki in the 2008 film The Divine Weapon.
 Portrayed by Jeon Moo-song in the 2011 JTBC TV series Insu, The Queen Mother.
 Portrayed by Kang San, Song Joong-ki and Han Suk-kyu in the 2011 SBS TV series Deep Rooted Tree.
 Portrayed by Ju Ji-hoon in the 2012 film I Am the King.
 Portrayed by Yoon Doo-joon in the 2015 MBC TV series Splash Splash Love.
 Portrayed by Nam Da-reum in the 2015 SBS TV series Six Flying Dragons.
 Portrayed by Kim Sang-kyung in the 2016 KBS1 TV series Jang Yeong-sil.
 Portrayed by Han Suk-kyu in the 2019 film Forbidden Dream.
 Portrayed by Song Kang-ho in the 2019 film The King's Letters.
 Portrayed by Jang Dong-yoon in the 2021 SBS TV series Joseon Exorcist.
 Portrayed by Kim Min-ki in the 2021–2022 KBS1 TV Series The King of Tears, Lee Bang-won.

Video games
Leader of the Korean civilization in Sid Meier's Civilization VI’s Leader Pass DLC.
Leader of the Korean civilization in Sid Meier's Civilization V.
Leader of the Korean civilization in Civilization Revolution 2.
 King Sejong Station LE, a major tournament map in the game StarCraft II: Heart of the Swarm.
Starting ruler of Korea in Europa Universalis IV.

See also

King Sejong Institute
King Sejong Station
Sejong Center
Sejong City
 
Sejongno
UNESCO King Sejong Literacy Prize
Hunminjeongeum
Hangul

Notes

Further reading
Kim, Yung Sik. (1998). "Problems and Possibilities in the Study of the History of Korean Science," Osiris (2nd series, Volume 13, 1998): 48–79.
King Sejong the Great: the Light of Fifteenth Century Korea, Young-Key Kim-Renaud, International Circle of Korean Linguistics, 1992, softcover, 119 pages, .
Kim-Renaud, Young-Key. 2000. Sejong's theory of literacy and writing. Studies in the Linguistic Sciences 30.1:13–46.
Gale, James Scarth. History of the Korean People Annotated and introduction by Richard Rutt. Seoul: Royal Asiatic Society, 1972.

External links
King Sejong's Confucian Humanism in the Early Choson Period
Location of the four forts and the six posts
King Sejong featured on the 10000 Korean Won banknote.
King Sejong the Great: The Everlasting Light of Korea.

 
1397 births
1450 deaths
15th-century Korean monarchs
Creators of writing systems
Deaths from diabetes
Linguists from Korea
Korean Buddhists
Korean Confucianists
People from Seoul